Tomáš Vondráček (born February 16, 1991) is a Czech professional ice hockey player. He currently plays with HC Karlovy Vary in the Czech Extraliga (ELH) on loan from HC Dynamo Pardubice.

Vondráček made his Czech Extraliga debut playing with HC Kometa Brno debut during the 2012–13 Czech Extraliga season.

References

External links

1991 births
Living people
Czech ice hockey forwards
HC Kometa Brno players
SK Horácká Slavia Třebíč players
HC Karlovy Vary players
HC Dynamo Pardubice players
HC Plzeň players
Sportspeople from Třebíč